71-73 Kent Street, Millers Point are heritage-listed terrace houses located at 7-73 Kent Street, in the inner city Sydney suburb of Millers Point in the City of Sydney local government area of New South Wales, Australia. The property was added to the New South Wales State Heritage Register on 2 April 1999.

History 
Millers Point is one of the earliest areas of European settlement in Australia, and a focus for maritime activities. This building was constructed  and kept in good condition. Renovations  converted the building to four one-bedroom units. First tenanted by the NSW Department of Housing in 1988.

Description 

A well proportioned Victorian house, some Italianate features. In almost intact condition this building now contains four 1 bedroom units. Storeys: Two; Construction: Painted rendered masonry walls, slate roof to main body of house, corrigated galvanised iron to balcony verandah, and rear wing. Cast iron balcony lace. Style: Victorian Italianate.

The external condition of the property is good.

Heritage listing 
As at 23 November 2000, this residence is an important streetscape element.

It is part of the Millers Point Conservation Area, an intact residential and maritime precinct. It contains residential buildings and civic spaces dating from the 1830s and is an important example of 19th century adaptation of the landscape.

71-73 Kent Street, Millers Point was listed on the New South Wales State Heritage Register on 2 April 1999.

See also 

Australian residential architectural styles

References

Bibliography

Attribution

External links

 

New South Wales State Heritage Register sites located in Millers Point
Kent Street, Millers Point, 71-73
Terraced houses in Sydney
Articles incorporating text from the New South Wales State Heritage Register
Italianate architecture in Sydney
1864 establishments in Australia
Houses completed in 1864
Millers Point Conservation Area